Edward Stanisław Czesak (born 22 February 1951 in Tarnów) is a Polish politician. He was elected to the Sejm on 25 September 2005, getting 7529 votes in 15 Tarnów district as a candidate from the Law and Justice list. He was elected in 2014 and currently serves as an MEP.

See also
Members of Polish Sejm 2005-2007

External links 
 Edward Czesak - parliamentary page - includes declarations of interest, voting record, and transcripts of speeches.
 

1951 births
Living people
Politicians from Tarnów
Members of the Polish Sejm 2005–2007
Law and Justice MEPs
MEPs for Poland 2014–2019
Members of the Polish Sejm 2007–2011